William Shaffir is a Canadian sociologist. Shaffir has conducted studies on Canadian Jews, particularly on Hasidic Jews in Canada. He is the Associate Chair of the Sociology Department at McMaster University. He co-authored the book The Jews in Canada.

Sociological research
William Shaffir has conducted a number of qualitative studies on Canadian Jewry.

Studies on Canadian Hasidim
Shaffir has conducted studies on several of the Hasidic groups in Montreal, including the Chabad-Lubavitch and Tosh Hasidic communities.

External links
Shaffir's website on the Tosh community

References

Living people
Jewish Canadian sociologists
Canadian sociologists
Year of birth missing (living people)